Ye is a second-person, plural, personal pronoun (nominative), spelled in Old English as "ge". In Middle English and Early Modern English, it was used as a both informal second-person plural and formal honorific, to address a group of equals or superiors or a single superior. While its use is archaic in most of the English-speaking world, it is used in Newfoundland and Labrador in Canada, and some parts of Ireland to distinguish from the singular "you".

Confusion with definite article 
"Ye" is also sometimes used to represent an Early Modern English form of the definite article "the" (pronounced ), such as in "Ye Olde Shoppe". "The" was often written "" (here the "e" is written above the other letter to save space, but it could also be written on the line). The lower letter is thorn, commonly written þ but which in handwritten scripts could resemble a "y" as shown. Thus, the article The was written Þe and never Ye. Medieval printing presses did not contain the letter thorn. Thus, the letter y was substituted owing to its similarity to some medieval scripts, especially later ones. The "thorn" character was supplanted during the later phases of Middle English and the earlier phases of Early Modern English by the modern digraph "th".

Etymology
In Old English, the use of second-person pronouns was governed by a simple rule:  addressed one person,  addressed two people, and  addressed more than two. After the Norman Conquest, which marks the beginning of the French vocabulary influence that characterised the Middle English period, the singular was gradually replaced by the plural as the form of address for a superior and later for an equal. The practice of matching singular and plural forms with informal and formal connotations, respectively, is called the T–V distinction, and in English it is largely due to the influence of French. This began with the practice of addressing kings and other aristocrats in the plural. Eventually, this was generalised, as in French, to address any social superior or stranger with a plural pronoun, which was believed to be more polite. In French,  was eventually considered either intimate or condescending (and, to a stranger, potentially insulting), while the plural form  was reserved and formal. In Early Modern English, ye functioned as both an informal plural and formal singular second-person nominative pronoun. "Ye" is still commonly used as an informal plural in Hiberno‐English and Newfoundland English. Both dialects also use variants of "ye" for alternative cases, such as "yeer" (your), "yeers" (yours), and "yeerselves" (yourselves).

See also 
 Y'all
 Yinz

References

Second-person plural pronouns in English